William Mensah (born July 15, 1982, in Accra) is a Ghanaian retired footballer who played as a defender.

Career

Haras El Hodood
Mensah previously played for Haras El Hodood, whom he helped win the 2008–09 Egypt Cup. He played well in Haras El Hodood's CAF Confederation Cup 2008 campaign. Mensah was involved in an incident with Ahly's striker Flávio Amado in an Egyptian Premier League match on 11 May 2009.

Lierse
27 May 2009 it was announced that he joined the Belgium club Lierse S.K. with a 2-year contract. The team gained promotion to the Belgian First Division by the end of that season, but meantime the Ghanaian defender appeared only 8 times during that campaign. That was due to a serious shoulder injury.

Wadi Degla
On 17 May 2010, Lierse announced that Mensah will join the Egyptian sister club, Wadi Degla, from the beginning of next season. Mensah is returning to Egypt once more, but to help a newly promoted team to the Egyptian Premier League this time.

International career
Mensah was called-up in the Ghana national football team for a 2010 FIFA World Cup qualification against Egypt in January 2009, but did not appear in the match.

Honours
With Haras El Hodood
 Winner of Egyptian Soccer Cup 2009.

References

External links
Profile at FilGoal

1982 births
Living people
Ghanaian footballers
Association football defenders
Footballers from Accra
Wadi Degla SC players
Lierse S.K. players
Ashanti Gold SC players
KFC Turnhout players
Sime Darby F.C. players
Al-Hazem F.C. players
Saudi First Division League players
Ghanaian expatriate sportspeople in Belgium
Ghanaian expatriate sportspeople in Egypt
Ghanaian expatriate sportspeople in Malaysia
Ghanaian expatriate sportspeople in Saudi Arabia
Expatriate footballers in Belgium
Expatriate footballers in Egypt
Expatriate footballers in Malaysia
Expatriate footballers in Saudi Arabia